Yunlong County is under the administration of the Dali Bai Autonomous Prefecture in the northwest of Yunnan Province, China; it is the westernmost county-level division of Dali Prefecture.

Administrative divisions
Yunlong County has 4 towns, 5 townships and 2 ethnic townships. 
4 towns

5 townships

2 ethnic townships
 Tuanjie Yi
 Miaowei Lisu

Ethnic groups
There are 2,448 Achang in Yunlong County, most of whom reside in Renshan Village 仁山村, Caojian Town 漕涧镇 (Dali Ethnic Gazetteer 2009:216).

Climate

References

External links
 Yunlong County Official Website

County-level divisions of Dali Bai Autonomous Prefecture